You Kwang-woo (Hangul: 유광우; born  in Seoul) is a South Korean male volleyball player. You competed at the 2007 FIVB World Cup and the 2015 FIVB World League as part of the South Korea men's national volleyball team. On club level he currently plays for Incheon Korean Air Jumbos.

External links
 profile at FIVB.org

1985 births
Living people
South Korean men's volleyball players
Place of birth missing (living people)
21st-century South Korean people